Henry Laycock (March 14, 1842 – May 2, 1929) was a member of the Wisconsin State Assembly.

Biography
Laycock was born on March 14, 1842, in Yorkshire, England. During the American Civil War, he served with the 8th Regiment Illinois Volunteer Cavalry of the Union Army. In 1872, Laycock married Margaret E. Brewer (1842–1912). They had two children. He died in Eau Claire on May 2, 1929.

Laycock helped build what is now known as the Barnes Block, listed on the National Register of Historic Places.

Political career
Laycock was elected to the Assembly in 1908 and 1912. Other positions he held include alderman of Eau Claire, Wisconsin. He was a Republican.

References

External links
 

People from Yorkshire
English emigrants to the United States
19th-century English people
People from Whiteside County, Illinois
Politicians from Chippewa Falls, Wisconsin
Politicians from Eau Claire, Wisconsin
Republican Party members of the Wisconsin State Assembly
Wisconsin city council members
People of Illinois in the American Civil War
Union Army soldiers
1842 births
1929 deaths
Burials in Wisconsin